Peter Musevski (12 June 1965 – 18 March 2020) was a Slovenian actor. He was born in 1965 in Ljubljana, Slovenia. He studied drama acting at the Ljubljana Film Academy (AGRFT). He appeared in many award-winning films that received prizes at the world's most eminent festivals.

Musevski died on 18 March 2020, aged 54.

Selected filmography
2019: Half-Sister (d. Damjan Kozole)
2016: Nightlife (d. Damjan Kozole)
2009: Slovenian Girl (d. Damjan Kozole)
2008: Forever (d. Damjan Kozole)
2007: I’m from Titov Veles (d. Teona Mitevska)
2005: Labour Equals Freedom (d. Damjan Kozole)
2005: Tuning (d. Igor Šterk)
2003: Spare Parts (d. Damjan Kozole)
2001: Bread and Milk (d. Jan Cvitkovič)
1995: Gone with the Train (d. Igor Šterk)
1995: Halgato (d. Andrej Mlakar)

References

1965 births
2020 deaths
Slovenian male film actors
Actors from Ljubljana
University of Ljubljana alumni
21st-century Slovenian male actors